The Bracari or Callaeci Bracari were an ancient Celtic tribe of Gallaecia, living in the northwest of modern Portugal, in the province of Minho, between the rivers Tâmega and Cávado. After the conquest of the region  beginning in 136BC, the Romans established the Augustan citadel of Bracara, modern Braga, in 20 BC. 

Appian wrote they were a very warlike people. According to him, The Bracari  women warriors fought defending their town "never turning, never showing their backs or uttering a cry."

It has long been known that they spoke a Celtic language, as can be seen in the inscription dedicated to the goddess Nabia at Braga's Fonte do Ídolo (Portuguese for the Fountain of the Idol), or in the name of their town Tongobriga (in Marco de Canaveses).

The region was home to some native and notable citadels that fiercely resisted Roman rule and were sieged by the Romans. These were Lambriaca, Avobriga, and Cinania. Lambriaca and Avobriga were located near the coast, probably near the river mouth of the Ave river where some citadels ruins are known. At the beginning of the 1st century, the Citânia de Briteiros was one of their main citadels and seat of the "consilium gentis." Cividade de Terroso, near the Ave river mouth, shows archaeological signs of the Roman siege and conquest. It was suggested that Citânia de Briteiros could be ancient Cinania. However, this is not certain, as there were other citadels nearby, including Citânia de Sanfins. It is known that cinania had luxuries and an iron ore mine, used for a surprise attack on the Roman camp. It is possible that the Celtic Nemetati were an allied tribe of the Bracari. 

Neighbouring this people or tribe, to the south were the Gallaeci Proper or Callaeci (that gave the name to the larger tribal confederation of the same name - the Gallaeci) and the Narbasi, to the north were the Luanci, Nebisoci and Seurbi, to the east were the Nemetati and the Lubaini, to the west were the Atlantic coast.

The goddess Nabia was very popular in the territory of the Callaici Bracari with several inscriptions, like the one at Braga's Fonte do Ídolo (Portuguese for Fountain of the Idol).

See also
Castro culture
Pre-Roman peoples of the Iberian Peninsula

References
Coutinhas, José Manuel (2006), Aproximação à identidade etno-cultural dos Callaici Bracari, Porto.
Queiroga, Francisco (1992), War and Castros, Oxford.
Silva, Armando Coelho Ferreira da (1986), A Cultura Castreja, Porto.

External links

Detailed map of the Pre-Roman Peoples of Iberia (around 200 BC)

Tribes of Gallaecia
Galician Celtic tribes
History of Braga
Ancient peoples of Portugal